Sha Tin Town Hall is a town hall at the town centre of the Sha Tin District in Hong Kong. It is located near Sha Tin station, Sha Tin Park and New Town Plaza. It is part of the podium complex which includes the Sha Tin Town Hall, Sha Tin Public Library and the Sha Tin Marriage Registry.

The facility was formerly governed by the Regional Council but has been transferred to the jurisdiction of the Leisure and Cultural Services Department.

History
The Sha Tin Town Hall opened in January 1987.

See also
Hong Kong City Hall
Sai Wan Ho Civic Centre
Tsuen Wan Town Hall
Tuen Mun Town Hall

References

External links

 

Sha Tin
Sha Tin District
Music venues in Hong Kong
City and town halls in Hong Kong
Concert halls in Hong Kong